Stu Daye is an American musician. Daye has provided vocals and played guitar on records by such artists as Alice Cooper and Nils Lofgren as well as having a successful solo career.

Stu Daye Band 
Free Parking (Columbia, PC-33936) was Daye's first offering on a major label. It came out on Columbia in April 1976 and was produced by Jack Douglas of Aerosmith and Patti Smith fame. It was engineered by Shelly Yakus and Rod O'Brian. The album featured Steve Gadd and Rick Marrotta on drums, Tony Levin on bass and featured special appearances by Aerosmith vocalist Steve Tyler and Billy Squier. The touring band consisted of at different times Christian Osbourne (guitar), Billy Cross (guitar), Mike Neville (bass) and Steve Missal and Tommy Thomson on drums. During this period Daye toured with Rush on their 2112 tour to showcase his material.

The Stu Daye Band played with musicians such as Aerosmith, Ted Nugent, Mott the Hoople, Thin Lizzy, Rick Derringer and Jeff Beck with Jan Hammer.

After leaving The Stu Daye Band, Cross went on to form the Delta Cross Band whose single, "Astro Kid", was written by Daye. His version of this track can be heard on Daye's 2009 album, All Roads Lead Here.

The Mix 
The Mix was formed of New York musicians of the time. It was a classic quartet with Daye on vocals/guitar, Corky Laing (later of Mountain) on drums, Chris Meredith on keyboards and vocals and David Grahame on bass guitar. Managed by Aerosmiths management Leber & Krebs, they were fast becoming renowned for their energetic live performances making them the darlings of the New York scene. In 1980, they released their first and only album, American Glue, on Leber & Krebs owned label "Word of Mouth" (Epic Records). The album was produced by Felix Pappalardi. At a gig supporting Judas Priest on July 4, 1980 the band played through a hail of fireworks from the Judas Priest fans only to be lauded for completing their set.

Theatre 
Since 1985, Daye has occasionally been involved in original and fringe theatre. His credits include Kaboodle Theatre ('Falstaff's Revenge', 'Rasputin - The Forbidden Story' - Composer/Performer/Actor), George Dillon ('The Gospel According To Matthew' - Composer/Musician), Josette Bushell-Mingo ('The House of Bernarda Alba' - Composer/Musician), The Adam Temple Show (Actor/Performer) and Adam Temple's Football Fandango (Actor/Performer)

Discography
As Stu Daye
 Free Parking (1976)
 All Roads Lead Here (2009)

With Alice Cooper
 Muscle of Love (1973)
 DaDa (1983)
With Genya Ravan
 Urban Desire (1978)
With Nils Lofgren
 Nils (1979)
 Face the Music (2014)

With Tim Curry
 Read My Lips (1978)

With The Mix
 American Glue (1980)

With Neal Smith
 Platinum God (2009)

Compilations
 Back In The Night (Various Artists)  (Columbia AE7-1102/1103,USA) 2 x 7" (with Dr. Feelgood, Al Di Meola, Sutherland Brothers & Quiver, Pavlov's Dog and Les Dudek)

References

Living people
American male guitarists
American rock guitarists
Year of birth missing (living people)